is a high school in Harima, Hyogo, Japan. The school opened in 1984 and is the only high school in Harima.

History
The school was founded on 1 April 1984, with a total of 376 students in eight classes.

School principals
 1984–1988: Koji Kishimoto
 1988–1990: Tsutomu Umada
 1990–1992: Tadashi Kitahara
 1992–1995: Kiyoji Kawahara
 1995–1997: Makoto Nakayasu
 1997–1999: Isao Komai
 1999–2001: Tatsuo Nishiyama
 2001–2003: Yasuyuki Hashimoto
 2003–2004: Toru Nirooka
 2004–2006: Kazuaki Fujii
 2006–2008: Masafumi Fujimoto
 2008–Present: Akiko Tanimoto

References

External links
  

High schools in Hyōgo Prefecture